"Nobody Here But—" is a science fiction short story by American writer Isaac Asimov.  It was first published in the 1953 issue of Star Science Fiction Stories.

Plot summary
Mathematician Cliff Anderson and Electrical Engineer Bill Billings work at an Institute of Technology. The time is assumed to be the present, as the two men have just built a 'small' calculating machine that measures three feet high by six feet long and two feet deep — a machine which would have seemed normal by the standards of the  early 1950s.

Bill longs to marry his girlfriend Mary Ann, but he is too shy to get up the courage to ask her.

The two friends have been working on further developing the machine, which they call 'Junior', increasing its abilities and reducing its size. But they find one day, visiting their laboratory with Mary Ann, that 'Junior' has gone into business for itself and is more advanced than they have realised. It has developed arms that can spiral out to reach tools and parts, it has built itself a loudspeaker and it has developed intelligence and an ability to reprogram itself.

Exasperated with Bill's indecision, Cliff demands that Bill propose to Mary Anne, which he does. The two men realise much later that it was not Cliff who made the demand. It was Cliff's voice — perfectly imitated by 'Junior'.

External links
 

Short stories by Isaac Asimov
1953 short stories